Tanypus is a genus of non-biting midges in the family Chironomidae. There are at least 100 described species in Tanypus.

See also
 List of Tanypus species

References

Further reading

External links

 
 
 

Tanypodinae